Željko Čajkovski (5 May 1925 – 11 November 2016) was a Croatian football player and coach, who played as a forward. He was born in Zagreb, Kingdom of Serbs, Croats and Slovenes.

Playing career

Club
At club level he played from 1942 for HAŠK Zagreb and, after the dissolution of the club, from 1945 onward for Dinamo Zagreb. With Dinamo he won the championship titles of 1950 and 1954 as well as the 1951 cup tournament. In 1956 he joined the German first division club Werder Bremen for two seasons. According to some sources he was amongst the ranks of 1. FC Nürnberg in the 1958–59 season. In the 1959–60 season, he served as player-manager of the northern Bavarian third division side 1. FC Lichtenfels, which he led to the Bavarian amateur championship.

International
With the Yugoslavia national team he won the silver medal in the football tournament of the 1948 Olympics held in London, losing in the final 1–3 to Sweden, then starring the young attacking trio of Gunnar Nordahl, Gunnar Gren, and Nils Liedholm. In the qualification for the 1950 World Cup in December 1949, he scored the winning goal in the 114th minute of the decisive match against France. Together with his brother Zlatko he was in the side that won its 1950 FIFA World Cup matches against Switzerland and Mexico, to which he contributed a goal. A 0–2 defeat against hosts and eventual runners up Brazil, however, put an end to the Yugoslav campaign. He earned a total of 19 caps, scoring 12 goals and his final international was a June 1951 friendly match against Switzerland.

Managerial career
Later he served as a coach for the German second division clubs SpVgg Fürth and Borussia Neunkirchen. He led Borussia into the Bundesliga, however he had to face relegation after one season. From 1971 he was at the helm of the third division club SSV Ulm 1846, winning the division two times, albeit failing to achieve promotion. In the first half of the 1974–75 season, he managed VfR Heilbronn, and in the second half, Wacker 04 Berlin, both in the second division.

Death
Čajkovski died in Munich, aged 91. He was reputed to be the oldest living Dinamo player at the time of his death after Stojan Osojnak died in 2016.

References

External links
 
  Željko Čajkovski Profile on Serbian national football team website
 
 
 

1925 births
2016 deaths
Footballers from Zagreb
Association football forwards
Yugoslav footballers
Yugoslavia international footballers
Olympic medalists in football
Medalists at the 1948 Summer Olympics
Footballers at the 1948 Summer Olympics
Olympic footballers of Yugoslavia
Olympic silver medalists for Yugoslavia
1950 FIFA World Cup players
Yugoslav First League players
HAŠK players
GNK Dinamo Zagreb players
SV Werder Bremen players
Oberliga (football) players
Yugoslav expatriate footballers
Expatriate footballers in West Germany
Yugoslav expatriate sportspeople in West Germany
Yugoslav football managers
SpVgg Greuther Fürth managers
Borussia Neunkirchen managers
SSV Ulm 1846 managers
FC Bayern Munich II managers
Yugoslav expatriate football managers
Expatriate football managers in West Germany